Baruch Mizrachi (Beit Baruch Mizrachi, "House of Baruch Mizrachi") is an old  Jewish family in Jerusalem, whose ancestor came to Jerusalem in 1621 and bought five houses in what is now called the Old City.

In 1643, Mizrachi wrote a will bequeathing the houses to his sons, yet preventing them from selling the houses, and obliging them to bequeath the houses to their sons, so that when the Messiah comes, Mizrahi will be able to return and live in his houses. The houses passed from generation to generation, and were the main reason that the family didn't leave Jerusalem (many other Jewish families left the city because of the economic conditions at the time). The houses were leased by the family members since the turn of the 20th century to an Arab family, while the family members built their houses outside the walls surrounding the Old City.

Post-independence
In 1948, the Old City was conquered by the Jordanian army, and the same Arab family continued living in the houses. When Israel conquered East Jerusalem in 1967, the family members returned to the houses and claimed ownership to the property. At the time, the Israeli authorities expropriated and demolished all the houses in the Jewish Quarter of the Old City of Jerusalem in order to build a new neighborhood, and hence the family members were able to collect only compensation, which they felt they were not allowed to collect because of Baruch Mizrachi's will. Instead it was agreed that on the new building, a plaque would be mounted with the family's story.

Jerusalem mayors Teddy Kollek, Uri Lupolianski and Nir Barkat promised that upon the arrival of the Messiah, Baruch Mizrachi will be able to receive from the municipality five new houses in Jerusalem.

Descendants
Several descendants of the family are known today, including former Israeli president Yitzhak Navon and Gilead Sher, an Israeli peace negotiator.

References

Families from Jerusalem
17th century in Jerusalem
Israeli families
Israeli Mizrahi Jews
Jews in Ottoman Palestine
Jews in Mandatory Palestine
Jews and Judaism in Jerusalem